is a Japanese voice actress and singer from Chiba Prefecture, Japan, affiliated with Horipro.

Voice roles

Anime

Video Games

References

External links
Official Site  
Official Blog 
 

Japanese voice actresses
1997 births
Living people
Voice actresses from Chiba Prefecture